Wattegama Railway Station is a railway station on the Matale railway line of Sri Lanka. It is the 62nd railway station on the line from Colombo Fort railway station and is located in the Kandy District in the Central Province. The station was opened on 14 October 1880 following the construction of a branch line from Kandy to Matale. It was established to primarily serve the growing number of cacao and tea estates in the area.

Location

Continuity

References

Railway stations on the Matale Line
Railway stations opened in 1880
Railway stations in Matale District